Hyun-seung, also spelled Hyon-sung, is a Korean masculine given name. The meaning differs based on the hanja used to write the name. There are 35 hanja with the reading "hyun" and 15 hanja with the reading "seung" on the South Korean government's official list of hanja which may be used in given names.

People with this name include:
Lee Hyun-seung (director) (born 1961), South Korean film director
Lee Hyun-seung (baseball) (born 1983), South Korean baseball pitcher
Kim Hyun-seung (born 1984), South Korean football player
Lee Hyun-seung (footballer) (born 1988), South Korean football player
Jang Hyun-seung (born 1989), South Korean singer

See also
List of Korean given names

References

Korean masculine given names